The OS MasterMap is the premier digital product of the Ordnance Survey. It was launched in November 2001. It is a database that records every fixed feature of Great Britain larger than a few meters in one continuous digital map. Every feature is given a unique TOID (TOpographical IDentifier), a simple identifier that includes no semantic information. Typically each TOID is associated with a polygon that represents the area on the ground that the feature covers, in National Grid coordinates. OS MasterMap is offered in themed "layers", for example a road layer and a building layer, each linked to a number of TOIDs. Pricing of licenses for OS MasterMap data depends on: the total area requested, the layers licensed, the number of TOIDs in the layers, the period in years of the data usage.

OS MasterMap can be used to generate maps for a vast array of purposes. Although the scale on a digital map is much more flexible than a paper map, one can print out maps from OS MasterMap data with detail equivalent to a traditional 1:1250 paper map.

Ordnance Survey claims that OS MasterMap data is never more than six months out of date, thanks to continuous review. The scale and detail of this mapping project is so far unique. Around 440 million TOIDs have so far been assigned, and the database stands at 600 terabytes in size.

Layers

Topography Layer

The OS MasterMap Topography Layer represents topography at a scale of 1:1250.  It is further subdivided into a number of themes: land area classifications' buildings, roads, tracks and paths, rail, water, terrain and height, heritage and antiquities, structures; and administrative boundaries.

Integrated Transport Network Layer
OS MasterMap® Integrated Transport Network™ (ITN) Layer maps Great Britain’s road network – from motorways to pedestrian streets. It contains attributes to enable the routing of vehicles, taking into account the limitations of the road network.

OS MasterMap Address Layer 2

OS MasterMap Address Layer 2 is a dataset that describes the location of addresses.  It is designed to be used as a means of geo-referencing addresses and attempts to improve on Address Point.  Address Layer is a part of the National Spatial Address Infrastructure and contains National Land and Property Gazetteer attributes that classify properties.  It is currently at the centre of a dispute between Ordnance Survey and Intelligent Addressing, the custodian of the National Land and Property Gazetteer dataset.

Imagery Layer

The Imagery layer is a national collection of 25cm resolution aerial photos.

Delivery of the data
OS MasterMap data is in GML format. It is usually delivered as files compressed with gzip (giving them an extension 'gz').

Recently, Ordnance Survey has been trialing delivery of OS MasterMap data using WFS and WMS, in accordance with the Open Geospatial Consortium. This trial may even end up with automatic updates using WFS-T.

Custodianship of the data
Although branded like a commercial product, OS MasterMap is in fact the UK’s most complete, accurate and up-to-date geographic record. By moving to purely digital media for mapping, Ordnance Survey brings upon itself the responsibility of being the sole mandatory custodian of Great Britain's official maps. Previously, by virtue of being a publication on paper, a copy of every edition of every paper map published by Ordnance Survey would have been deposited, by law, with each of the six legal deposit libraries in the UK. Although there is no such law in place for digital maps, the Ordnance Survey makes annual 'snapshots' of the data and voluntarily deposits with the legal deposit libraries:

The data, like any other, is susceptible to all the problems of computer data storage and digital preservation, for example: data corruption; the question of how often to take snapshots of the data (i.e. should every edit be recorded?); access to old versions of the data; practicable access to old versions of the data (after format changes, will new software be able to read old data?).

References

External links
 
 The Guardian: Devil is in the detail as OS maps out the future by Paul Brown, March 8, 2004
 Example of MasterMap supply
 Example GIS application of Web Based Asset Management and MasterMap supply

Geographical databases in the United Kingdom
Maps from Ordnance Survey
Maps of the United Kingdom
2001 works